The 2020 Marshall Thundering Herd football team represented Marshall University in the 2020 NCAA Division I FBS football season. The Thundering Herd played their home games at Joan C. Edwards Stadium in Huntington, West Virginia, and competed in the East Division of Conference USA (CUSA). They were led by eleventh-year head coach Doc Holliday.

The game against Middle Tennessee marked the 50th anniversary of the crash of Southern Airways Flight 932, which took place on November 14, 1970, and killed 75 people.

Previous season
The Thundering Herd finished the 2019 regular season 8–5, 6–2 in CUSA which they tied for second in the East Division with Western Kentucky. The team was invited to play in the Gasparilla Bowl against UCF, where the Thundering Herd took their fifth loss of the season.

Preseason

Award watch lists
Listed in the order that they were released

CUSA media days
The CUSA Media Days will be held virtually for the first time in conference history.

Preseason All-CUSA teams
To be released

Schedule
Marshall announced its 2020 football schedule on January 8, 2020. The 2020 schedule originally consisted of 6 home and 6 away games in the regular season.

The Thundering Herd had games scheduled against Boise State, East Carolina, Ohio, Old Dominion, and Pittsburgh, which were canceled due to the COVID-19 pandemic These were partially replaced with games against Appalachian State, Eastern Kentucky, and UMass.

Game summaries

Eastern Kentucky

Appalachian State

at Western Kentucky

at Louisiana Tech

Florida Atlantic

UMass

Middle Tennessee

Rice

UAB (Conference USA Championship)

Buffalo (Camellia Bowl)

Rankings

Players drafted into the NFL

References

Marshall
Marshall Thundering Herd football seasons
Marshall Thundering Herd football